Zamia loddigesii is a species of plant in the family Zamiaceae. It is found in Guatemala and Mexico. It is threatened by habitat loss.

References

loddigesii
Near threatened plants
Taxonomy articles created by Polbot
Taxa named by Friedrich Anton Wilhelm Miquel